Richard Ferrybridge was an English Scholastic logician of the fourteenth century.

His works include a Tractatus de veritate sive logica, and the Consequentiae. He is alluded to in The Anatomy of Melancholy.

References

Notes

English logicians
14th-century English people
English philosophers